Dosinia discus, or the disk dosinia, is a species of bivalve mollusc in the family Veneridae. It can be found along the Atlantic coast of North America, ranging from Virginia to Florida.

References

Dosinia
Bivalves described in 1850